Dragi Kanatlarovski - Capar (born 8 November 1960) is a Macedonian football manager and former player. He represented the Yugoslav national team and the Macedonian national team.

Name issue 
His original name is Dragi and not Dragan as he is often mistaken for. The confusion happens since in North Macedonia Dragi is one of the nicknames for those who are called Dragan, but not in this case. Similar problem has the current goalkeeper of the Macedonian national team, Tome Pačovski who is mistaken for Tomislav.

Player career 
Born in Bitola, FPR Yugoslavia, he played for his hometown club FK Pelister before moving to FK Vardar where he will play four seasons. In 1989, he moved to Red Star Belgrade. He played one season in Belgrade, but it was enough to win the double, the Yugoslav Championship and the Yugoslav Cup. After that season he moved to Spain where he was Segunda División runner-up in summer 1991 and helped Deportivo La Coruña to be promoted back to La Liga where he played in the 1991–92 season, having reached the Spanish Cup semi-finals.

International career 
He earned his only cap for SFR Yugoslavia against Poland, in a friendly held on 28 March 1990. After the dissolution of Yugoslavia he represented Macedonia having played nine matches, scoring twice, between 1993 and 1995.  He played in the first ever official match of Macedonia, played on 13 October 1993, against Slovenia.

International goals

Scores and results list Macedonia's goal tally first.

Coaching career 
He has been the coach of the Republic of Macedonia twice. He first spell ended due to Republic of Macedonia not qualifying for World Cup 2002. He then became coach of FK Belasica but sacked again in June 2002. In September 2002, he was appointed by FK Kumanovo, then FK Pobeda in December. until June 2003 as coach of both national side and the club. He became full-time national team coach in January 2004.

His second spell ended because of poor results in World Cup 2006 qualifying matches, especially losing to Andorra. He was then replaced by Slobodan Santrač.

He became FK Vardar coach in December 2005.

In 2008, he became coach of Lokomotiv Plovdiv.

References

External links 
 Player profile on Yugoslavia / Serbia National Team page
 Dragi Kanatlarovski Official website
 Dragi Kanatlarovski at MacedonianFootball.com
 
 Dragi Kanatlarovski at FFM
 
 Dragi Kanatlarovski at LFP

1960 births
Living people
Sportspeople from Bitola
Association football midfielders
Yugoslav footballers
Yugoslavia international footballers
Macedonian footballers
North Macedonia international footballers
Dual internationalists (football)
FK Pelister players
FK Vardar players
Red Star Belgrade footballers
Deportivo de La Coruña players
Karşıyaka S.K. footballers
FK Pobeda players
Yugoslav Second League players
Yugoslav First League players
Segunda División players
La Liga players
Süper Lig players
Macedonian First Football League players
Yugoslav expatriate footballers
Macedonian expatriate footballers
Expatriate footballers in Spain
Yugoslav expatriate sportspeople in Spain
Macedonian expatriate sportspeople in Spain
Expatriate footballers in Turkey
Macedonian expatriate sportspeople in Turkey
Macedonian football managers
Premier League of Bosnia and Herzegovina managers
FK Pobeda managers
FK Belasica managers
FK Vardar managers
North Macedonia national football team managers
FK Kumanovo managers
PFC Lokomotiv Plovdiv managers
FK Radnički 1923 managers
FK Spartak Subotica managers
FK Novi Pazar managers
FK Velež Mostar managers
FK Lovćen managers
Macedonian expatriate football managers
Expatriate football managers in Bulgaria
Macedonian expatriate sportspeople in Bulgaria
Expatriate football managers in Serbia
Macedonian expatriate sportspeople in Serbia
Expatriate football managers in Bosnia and Herzegovina
Macedonian expatriate sportspeople in Bosnia and Herzegovina
Expatriate football managers in Montenegro
Macedonian expatriate sportspeople in Montenegro